Albina Engine & Machine Works was a shipyard along the Willamette River in Portland, Oregon, United States. It was located in the Albina area of Portland along N. River Street and N. Loring Street. Albina Engine & Machine Works was founded in 1904. The shipyard produced a number of freighters during World War I, but operated mainly as a repair yard during the 1920s and 1930s. The Albina yard expanded its workforce and production during Portland's World War II shipbuilding boom. It specialized in producing subchasers, vessels designed to combat German U-boats. Albina Engine & Machine Works also built Landing Craft Support boats and cargo ships. Business declined in the post-war years, and Albina Engine & Machine Works was sold to the Dillingham Corporation around 1971.

Submarine chaser

21 of 343 s built during World War II for the US Navy:
   PC-569  delivered 8 May 42
	PC-570 18 April 42
	PC-570 18 April 42
	PC-571 22 May 42
	PC-572 17 June 42
	PC-578 13 July 42
	PC-579 24 August 42
	PC-580 26 September 42
	PC-581 9 October 42
	PC-582 22 October 42
	PC-1077 9 December 42
	PC-1078 5 February 43
	PC-1079 7 March 43
	PC-1080 29 March 43
	PC-1081 16 April 43
	PC-1082 8 May 43
	 8 January 43  collision and sank off San Diego 11-Sep-45
	PC-816 9 June 43
	 13 July 43
	PC-818 3 August 43
	PC-819 2 August 43
	PC-820 30 September 43

PCE-842-class patrol craft

20 of 68 PCE-842-class patrol craft submarine chaser built for World War II US Navy, 184 feet long with 	794 DWT:
	PCE-867 delivered 20 June 43
	PCE-868 31 August 43
	PCE-869 19 September 43
	PCE-870 5 October 43
	PCE-871 29 October 43
	PCE-872 29 November 43 became BRP Cebu
	PCE-873 15 December 43
	PCE-874 31 December 43
	PCE-875 19 January 44
	PCE-876 10 June 44, became USS Lodestone
	PCE-877 14 February 44 became USS Havre
	PCE-878 13 March 44
	PCE-879 10 July 44
	PCE-880 29 April 44
	PCE-881 31 July 44
	PCE-882 23 February 45
	PCE-883 13 November 44
	PCE-884 30 March 45
	PCE-885 30 April 45
	PCE-886 31 May 45

Landing Craft

LCI (L)
Landing Craft were not given names.  Albina built LCI(L) 1013 to  LCI(L) 1033 in 1944. There were Landing Craft Infantry Large. 
LCI(L) had a displacement 216 tons light, 234 tons landing; and 389 tons loaded. LCI(L) had a length of 158' 5 1/2", beam of 23' 3", light draft of 3'1". To speed of 16 kts and 4 kts continuous. They had four to five Oerlikon 20 mm cannons, each gun was mounted inside of a round gun tub with a shield. LCI(L)-1022 became the USS Rail (AMCU-37).

LCC (1)
Albina built 27, LCC 25470 to  LCC 25496 in 1943 and 1944. Landing Craft, Control Mark 1: displacement full, 30 tons, length56 feet - 17.1 m, beam 4 m, draft 1.2 m, top speed 13.5 kts, 450 HP, 2 diesel engines, armament two 90 mm gun. Landing Craft, Control were used by Scouts and Raiders leading the Invasion of Normandy on 6 June 1944. They had new radar system and help guide the landing craft on each landing.

LCC(2) 
Albina built 15, LCC(2) 39044 to LCC(2) 39058, in 1944. Landing Craft, Control, Mark 2, 56 feet long, 30 tons LDT.

LCS(L)
Albina built The Landing Craft Support (Large), or "LCS(L) Mark 3. Built from LCS(L) 61 to LCS(L) 78 and LCS(L) 48 to LCS(L) 60. 
Built on a standard LCI hull and was add more gunfire support and crew accommodation. They had a single 3"/50 caliber gun and/or two twin 40 mm cannon and numerous 20 mm cannon. Many were used in Pacific Theater invasions in late 1944 and into 1945.

Concrete Barge
These were a type of concrete ship a class of Type B ships. Steel shortages led the US military to order the construction of small fleets of ocean-going concrete barge and ships. Displacement: , full load: 1360 tons. Length:,  beam: , draft: , crew of 3 men. YOGN were a class Non-self-propelled Gasoline Barge: 
YOGN-114
YOGN-115 used to support cooling efforts at the Fukushima Daiichi nuclear power 
YOGN-116
YOGN-117
YOGN-118
YOGN-119 renamed YON 367, sunk as target 1973
YOGN-120 renamed Ex-BG 1165, sunk as target 1978
YOGN-121
YOGN-122 Ex-BG 8452, scrapped 1986
YOGN-123 Ex-BG 6380, YON 252
YOGN-124 Ex-BG 6383, struck 2006
YOGN-125 Ex-YWN 154, now YON
Built by Manitowoc SB in Manitowoc WI, 174 feet long, 440 tons.
YOGN-196 renamed Ex-YO 196, sunk as target 2000
YO 174
YO 175
YO 176
YO 177
YOG 61
YOG 62
YOG 63
YOG 64
YOG 65

C1-MT-BU1
The C1-MT-BU1 was a subtype of a Cargo Type C1 ship, modified from the C1 design for use as lumber transports, 5,032 DWT, launched in late 1945 and early 1946.

 4 of 4 C1-MT-BU1
Oregon Fir  wrecked and scrapped in 1967.
California Redwood
Washington Cedar
Arizona Pine

Coastal Freighter - FS
Albina built 20 Coastal Freighter, type FS in 1944 and 1945. Most were transferred to the Dutch Government. There they were used in Dutch East Indies, now Indonesia for inter-island shipping. The Dutch Government sold them to Koninklijke Paketvaart-Maatschappij in 1948. These were 555 DWT and 176 feet long.

Light vessel
Albina built three Lightvessel for the U.S. Coast Guard. Each was: length of 133 feet 3 inches (40.6 m), 33 feet (10.1 m) beam and draft of 11 feet 9 inches (3.6 m) These were specially built as a self-propelled ship that would remain on station for nine months of a year. Outfitted with housekeeping and the light
.
 LV 100 Blunts Reef Completed on 10 February 1930, transferred to the US Navy in 1971, taken to Vietnam.
 LV 113 Swiftsure Banks Completed on 	15 June 1930, donated in 1969 to Sea Scouts, back, then back to USCG, sold for scrap. Sank at shipyard in Willamette River, Portland Or., raised and used for floating restaurant from 1983 to 1987. Sold in 1988 and sank in while being towed to Alaska.
Lightship No. 114 Fire Island (WAL-536) Completed  1930. Lightship No. 114 was an active lightship from 1930 to 1971.  Her last port was at Portland, Maine.  In 1975 she was purchased by the city of New Bedford, Massachusetts.  She was not drydocked for normal maintain, her hull rusted.  She sank at her station on May 31, 2006, and scrapped.

World War I
 
For World War I in 1918 and 1919, Albina built 17 cargo ships. These were their first ships, Hulls #1 to 17. These were requisitioned by the United States Shipping Board (USSB). Some of the cargo ships built for World War I:
Point Loma/Margit	Hull #	1, renamed SS Dorothy Phillips
Point Arena/Erling	Hull #2
Point Bonita Hull #3  wrecked in 1953
Point Lobos/Skjold	Hull #4   burnt in 1967
Point Judith became Charles L. Wheeler Jr. Hull #5
Point Adams/Gorm	Hull #6 foundered in 1953
Cadaretta	Hull #7
Caddopeak	Hull #8  renamed USS Besboro
Callabasas	Hull #9  torpedoed and lost in 1942 as Watsonville
Jacox	Hull #10     wrecked in 1943
Glendola	Hull #11 torpedoed and lost in 1940
Glendoyle	Hull #12    foundered in 1948
Glorieta	Hull #13 torpedoed and lost in 1942
Glymont	Hull #14   sunk by gunfire in 1942
Glyndon	Hull #15     Foundered in 1924
Meriden	Hull #16   scuttled in 1946, renamed USS Majaba
Doylestown	Hull #17  foundered in 1968

Shipbuilding on the Columbia and Willamette Rivers

 Willamette River
 Portland
 East bank
 Albina Engine & Machine Works
 Swan Island Shipyard
 Oregon Shipbuilding Company
 West Bank
 Willamette Iron and Steel Works
 Northwest Steel
 Columbia River Shipbuilding
 Columbia River
 Vancouver
 East Bank (Washington)
 Kaiser Vancouver shipyard
 G. M. Standifer Construction #2 (wood)
 G. M. Standifer Construction #3 (steel)
 West Bank (Oregon)
 G. M. Standifer Construction #1 (wood)
 Astoria
 McEachern Shipbuilding Company
 Wilson Shipbuilding
 George F. Rodgers & Company

 TBD
 Foundation Company, Portland
 Peninsula Shipbuilding, Portland
 Supple-Ballin, Portland
 Grant Smith-Porter, Portland
 Sommarstrom Shipbuilding, Portland
 Coast Shipbuilding Company, Portland
 Columbia Engineering Works, Portland

References

External links

 Media related to Albina Engine & Machine Works at the Oregon Historical Society

1904 establishments in Oregon
American companies established in 1904
Companies based in Portland, Oregon
Defunct shipbuilding companies of the United States
Shipbuilding companies of Oregon
Defunct manufacturing companies based in Oregon